Nalorphine dinicotinate (trade name Nimelan), also known as N-allylnormorphine dinicotinate, dinicotinoylnalorphine, or niconalorphine, is a semisynthetic, mixed opioid agonist-antagonist which is described as a narcotic antagonist but may produce limited analgesia and sedation at higher doses in opioid naive patients (with limited euphoria and dependence liability). It is the 3,6-dinicotinate ester of nalorphine, and is therefore the nalorphine analogue of nicomorphine (which is the 3,6-dinicotinate ester of morphine).

As nalorphine dinicotinate is only regulated at the Rx (prescription required) drug, it would be legal to possess with a valid prescription should a patient manage to acquire it.

See also
 Diacetylnalorphine

References

Allyl compounds
4,5-Epoxymorphinans
Kappa-opioid receptor antagonists
Nicotinate esters
Mu-opioid receptor agonists
Mu-opioid receptor antagonists
Phenols
Semisynthetic opioids